Vârtoape is a commune in Teleorman County, Muntenia, Romania. It is composed of three villages: Gărăgău, Vârtoapele de Jos and Vârtoapele de Sus (the commune center).

References

Communes in Teleorman County
Localities in Muntenia